Elisardo de la Torre (born 10 October 1971) is a Spanish middle-distance runner. He competed in the men's 3000 metres steeplechase at the 1996 Summer Olympics.

References

1971 births
Living people
Athletes (track and field) at the 1996 Summer Olympics
Spanish male middle-distance runners
Spanish male steeplechase runners
Olympic athletes of Spain
Place of birth missing (living people)
20th-century Spanish people